The Pakistan national cricket team toured New Zealand in February to March 2001 and played a three-match Test series against the New Zealand national cricket team. The series was drawn 1–1. New Zealand were captained by Stephen Fleming and Pakistan by Moin Khan. In addition, the teams played a five-match series of Limited Overs Internationals (LOI) which New Zealand won 3–2.

One Day Internationals (ODIs)

1st ODI

2nd ODI

3rd ODI

4th ODI

5th ODI

Test series summary

1st Test

2nd Test

3rd Test

References

External links

2001 in Pakistani cricket
2001 in New Zealand cricket
International cricket competitions in 2000–01
New Zealand cricket seasons from 2000–01
2001